Dos mexicanos en Sevilla ("Two Mexicans in Seville") is a 1942 Mexican film. It stars Carlos Orellana. It was made as part of a series of Mexican films set in Spain in the 1940s, such as El verdugo de Sevilla (1942).

References

External links
 

1942 films
1940s Spanish-language films
Mexican black-and-white films
Mexican comedy-drama films
1942 comedy-drama films
1940s Mexican films